Night of the Living Dead (also known as George A. Romero's Dawn of the Dead) is a 1990 American horror film directed by Tom Savini (in his feature directorial debut) and starring Tony Todd and Patricia Tallman. It is a remake of George A. Romero's 1968 film of the same title; Romero rewrote the original 1968 screenplay he had originally co-authored with John A. Russo. Like the original, the film follows seven strangers as they meet and survive in a rural farmhouse, following the awakening of cannibalistic zombies. It is the only "official" remake of the 1968 film, with other "unofficial" remakes coming out after, as a result of the source material's lack of copyright ownership (resulting in being in the public domain).

Night of the Living Dead was released by Columbia Pictures in the United States on October 19, 1990. The film received negative reviews upon initial release, and was considered a box office bomb, grossing only $5.8 million against a $4.2 million budget.

Plot 
Siblings Barbara and Johnny visit their mother's grave in a remote Pennsylvania cemetery. During their visit, an elderly man who is in shock and has blood on his forehead, bumps into them and flees in terror. They offer to help him, but they are attacked by a zombie. Johnny is killed while Barbara flees the cemetery and discovers what appears to be an abandoned farmhouse. She seeks shelter there, only to find another pack of zombies. Shortly after, a man named Ben arrives after fleeing from a local diner that was attacked by zombies, and the two clear the house of the dead and begin the process of barricading the doors and windows.

They discover other survivors hiding in the cellar of the house: Harry Cooper, a selfish and argumentative husband; his wife Helen; their daughter Sarah, who was bitten by a zombie and has fallen seriously ill; and teenage lovers Tom Bitner and Judy Rose Larson. The group is divided over what their next course of action should be. Harry believes everyone should retreat to the cellar and barricade the door to wait for the authorities. Ben thinks the cellar is a "death trap" and that they would be better served fortifying the house, which at least has alternate escape routes, and Barbara suggests that the group should simply leave the house on foot after she notices the zombies' limited mobility. An argument between Ben and Harry leaves the Coopers in the basement to tend to their ailing daughter, while the other survivors go upstairs to continue reinforcing the doors and windows. The loud construction attracts a large mob of zombies to the farmhouse.

The group devises a plan to escape using Ben's truck, which is out of fuel, by refueling at a locked gas pump a few hundred yards away. They find a set of keys within the corpse who lived in the farmhouse. Judy Rose, Tom, and Ben proceed up the hill toward the gas pump, but their plan begins to unravel when Ben falls from the bed of the truck and is left to defend himself. To their horror, the key to the gas pump is not among the set they brought with them. When Tom shoots the lock off, the gasoline gushing forth is ignited by a burning piece of wood in the truck. The resulting explosion kills both Tom and Judy.

Ben returns to the house to find things beginning to dissolve into chaos. Harry has wrestled Barbara's gun away from her and is now armed. Unknown to the survivors upstairs, the Coopers' daughter Sarah has succumbed to the bite on her arm and has transformed into a zombie; she attacks and bites her distraught mother. When Sarah makes her way upstairs, she triggers a shootout between her father, who is trying to protect her, and Ben and Barbara, who are trying to protect themselves. Both Ben and Harry are badly wounded, and Barbara shoots Sarah. Harry retreats upstairs to the attic, while Ben makes his way to the cellar, where he shoots a reanimated Helen. Ben gradually goes into shock, and after realizing the gas key has been in the cellar the entire time, he laughs mindlessly at the irony before succumbing to his injuries and dies.

Meanwhile, Barbara leaves the house alone and attempts to find help. She eventually joins a group of countryside locals who are clearing the area of the undead, and awakens the next day surrounded by the safety of the media and townspeople, led by Sheriff McClelland. Noticing hillbillies playing around with a few zombies, she comments on the similarities between the living and the undead. She returns to the farmhouse to find Ben, who has now been reanimated; he gazes at Barbara before being shot. When Harry emerges from the attic alive, Barbara kills him in a fit of rage and retribution for causing Ben's death, and turns to leave the house, telling the vigilantes they have "another one for the fire." Barbara watches as the bodies are burned on a pyre.

Cast 
 Tony Todd as Ben
 Patricia Tallman as Barbara Todd
 Tom Towles as Harry Cooper
 McKee Anderson as Helen Cooper
 William Butler as Tom Bitner
 Katie Finneran as Judy Rose Larson
 Bill Moseley as Johnny Todd
 Heather Mazur as Sarah Cooper
 Russell Streiner as Sheriff McClelland (uncredited). Streiner played Johnny in the original film.
 Bud Koffler as Zombie Hunter
 Greg Funk as Cemetery Zombie
 Pat Logan as Uncle Rege
 Albert Shellhammer as Cousin Satchel
 Bill "Chilly Billy" Cardille as Himself, reprising his role from the original, in a cameo appearance as the TV news reporter.

Production 
Night of the Living Dead (1968) director and co-writer George A. Romero said that the remake came about in part because of issues over profits of the original film.  A lengthy court battle over the rights to the film, plus an oversight that caused the copyright notice not to be included, caused Romero to see little in the way of profit.  Romero's production company, Image Ten, eventually won the lawsuit, but the distributor went out of business before they could collect any money.

Another issue was the fact that the filmmakers were worried that someone else might make an unauthorized remake.  Romero contacted Menahem Golan when he heard that 21st Century Film Corporation was interested in a remake, and Romero, John A. Russo, and Russell Streiner collaborated for the first time in 20 years.  Tom Savini was initially hired to perform the special effects, but was persuaded to direct by Romero.  Savini was drawn to the remake because he was unavailable to do special effects on the original.

The special effects team intentionally kept the effects restrained, as they felt that excessive gore would be disrespectful to the original film. To keep the effects realistic, they used as inspiration a real autopsy, forensic pathology textbooks, and Nazi death camp footage. Savini said that he wanted to keep the film artistic despite his reputation as "the king of splatter". The zombie extras were recruited easily, as the film's reputation drew them from as far away as Kentucky.

The production was not easy for Savini, who described it as "the worst nightmare of my life". Savini said that only 40% of his ideas made it into the final film. Without Romero on set, he clashed with the producers, who did not allow him to explore his vision for the film.

Release 
To avoid an X rating, Savini had to cut several scenes from the film. Savini attributed the film's lack of popularity among horror fans to these cuts. A Blu-ray version was released in a limited edition of 3,000 on October 9, 2012 by Twilight Time. Australian film distributor Umbrella Entertainment released a special edition of the film featuring a restored print, alongside the 1968 original on Blu-ray on April 6, 2016.

Reception 
The initial response and critical consensus among both audience members and critics was generally negative.

Owen Gleiberman of Entertainment Weekly rated it D+ and wrote, "In the history of bad ideas, George Romero's decision to produce a color remake of his disturbingly frenzied 1968 zombiefest Night of the Living Dead has to rank right up there with New Coke...The original Night was taken by some to be a statement about the Vietnam War; this one isn’t about anything larger than Romero’s desire to make a buck." Writing for the Chicago Sun-Times, Roger Ebert awarded the film one star out of a possible four, writing, "The remake is so close to the original that there is no reason to see both". Caryn James of The New York Times wrote, "There was no real need to remake a film that lives on the campy cult appeal it has acquired over time. But as B-movies and remakes go, this one knows how to bring tired zombies back to life." Variety called it "a crass bit of cinematic grave-robbing".   Kevin Thomas of the Los Angeles Times wrote, "While this Night hasn't the chilling, almost cinema-verite credibility of the original, it is certainly a well-sustained entertainment".  In The Washington Post, Richard Harrington criticized the film as a purely financial effort that lacks the shock of the original film now that zombie film tropes have become clichéd. Dave Kehr of the Chicago Tribune rated it three out of four stars and wrote that although Savini's direction is a bit too literal, the film "contains some intriguing further development of the ideas of the first film, as well as some mistakes corrected and dramatic relationships tightened."

On Rotten Tomatoes the film has an approval rating of 67% based on reviews from 33 critics, with an average rating of 6.3/10, and a critical consensus that reads "Night of the Living Dead doesn't quite reinvent the original's narrative, but its sleek action and amplified gore turn it into a worthy horror showcase. ". On Metacritic it has a score of 54 out of 100 based on reviews from 18 critics, indicating mixed to average reviews. Bloody Disgusting rated it four-and-a-half out of five stars and wrote, "This film works on so many levels. Normally, remakes are horrible, and diverge so much from the original film. This one is so close to the original it's scary." Reviewing the Twilight Time Blu-ray, Adam Tyner of DVD Talk rated it 3.5/5 stars and wrote, "We'll never get a chance to see the remake that Tom Savini set out to direct. Still, despite the many missteps of this severely compromised version, Night of the Living Dead manages to distinguish itself as one of the more effective horror remakes out there." Reviewing the same disc at DVD Verdict, Patrick Naugle rated it 83 out of 100 and called it "one of the superior zombies movies available".

Legacy
In the several years since its debut, the remake has garnished a small cult following, with Savini often screening an uncut work print VHS copy of the film at conventions.According to Savini,“Years later I was at a midnight showing and did a Q&A before the movie, and I wasn’t going to sit down and watch it, but I did…And it was the first time that I saw it objectively, and it’s good!”

In a retrospective at PopMatters, academic Cynthia Freeland compared the racial politics of the original film and the gender politics of the remake. Freeland concludes that the original film's depiction of Barbara makes for better cinema, and the more feminist-friendly update of Barbara is too derivative of standard "final girl" tropes.

See also
 Dawn of the Dead: The 2004 remake of A. Romero's 1978 film of the same name.

References

Bibliography

External links 

 
 
 
 

1990 films
1990 horror films
American zombie films
Columbia Pictures films
Remakes of American films
Horror film remakes
Night of the Living Dead (film series)
Siege films
Films about cannibalism
Films set in abandoned houses
Films set on farms
Films set in Pennsylvania
Films shot in Pennsylvania
Matricide in fiction
21st Century Film Corporation films
1990s English-language films
1990s American films